Jessica Rose Phillips (born 9 October 1981) is a British politician serving as the Member of Parliament (MP) for Birmingham Yardley since 2015. A member of the Labour Party, she has been Shadow Minister for Domestic Violence and Safeguarding in Keir Starmer's Opposition frontbench since 2020.

Phillips was appointed as Parliamentary Private Secretary (PPS) to Lucy Powell, the Shadow Education Secretary, in 2015. A vocal critic of the former Leader of the Labour Party Jeremy Corbyn, Phillips resigned as a PPS in protest over Corbyn's leadership and said she would "find it incredibly difficult" to continue as an MP if Corbyn were re-elected as Labour leader. She supported Owen Smith in the failed attempt to replace Corbyn in the 2016 leadership election. Phillips was a candidate for Labour leader in the 2020 leadership election, but withdrew early in the contest. Since 2019, Phillips has received the second highest income on top of her MP’s salary amongst Labour Party MPs.

Early life and career
Jessica Rose Phillips was born on 9 October 1981 in Birmingham, West Midlands. The youngest of four children, Phillips is the daughter of Stewart Trainor, a teacher, and Jean Trainor (née Mackay), an NHS administrator who rose to become deputy chief executive of the NHS Confederation and chair of South Birmingham Mental Health Trust. They were politically active: "Growing up with my father was like growing up with Jeremy Corbyn", she told Rachel Cooke of The Observer in March 2016. Phillips went to King Edward VI Camp Hill School for Girls, a local grammar school. Her childhood ambition was to become Prime Minister.

Phillips studied economic and social history and social policy at the University of Leeds from 2000 to 2003. She has said she marched in protest against the Iraq War. From 2011 to 2013, she studied for a postgraduate diploma in public sector management at the University of Birmingham.

Phillips worked for a period for her parents at their company, Healthlinks Event Management Services. From 2010 onwards, Phillips worked for the Women's Aid Federation of England as a business development manager, responsible for managing refuges for victims of domestic abuse in Sandwell in the West Midlands.

Phillips left the Labour Party during the years of Tony Blair's leadership, rejoining after the 2010 general election. Her period at Women's Aid as an administrator made Phillips "utterly pragmatic... I learned that my principles don't matter as much as [people's] lives." In the 2012 local elections, she was elected as a Labour councillor for the Longbridge ward, taking the seat from the Conservatives. She was then appointed as the victims' champion at Birmingham City Council, lobbying police and criminal justice organisations on behalf of victims. She also served on the West Midlands Police and Crime Panel.

Parliamentary career

Positions and party issues
Phillips verbally clashed with fellow Labour MP Diane Abbott on 14 September 2015 over the gender composition of Jeremy Corbyn's first Shadow Cabinet. After she asked Corbyn why he had failed to appoint a woman to shadow the great offices of state, Abbott accused her of being "sanctimonious" and said that Phillips was "not the only feminist in the PLP [Parliamentary Labour Party]". Corbyn did not intervene. Owen Bennett wrote in The Huffington Post that Phillips recounted: "I roundly told her to fuck off." When asked what Abbott did after that suggestion, Phillips replied: "She fucked off." According to Abbott in a January 2018 Guardian interview: "Jess Phillips never told me to fuck off. What was extraordinary is that she made a big deal of telling people she had." Phillips later apologised.

Phillips told Owen Jones in December 2015 that she had told Corbyn and his staff "to their faces: 'The day that ... you are hurting us more than you are helping us, I won't knife you in the back, I'll knife you in the front'," if it looked as though he was damaging Labour's chances of winning the next general election. Responding to criticism about her use of language, Phillips said on Twitter: "I am no more going to actually knife Jeremy Corbyn than I am actually a breath of fresh air, or a pain in the arse."

Phillips has commented that the "British Pakistani-Bangladeshi community" have "issues about women's roles in a family, in society" and were importing "wives for their disabled sons."

She is a member of Labour Friends of Israel.

Gender and sexual issues
In October 2015, Phillips caused social media outrage after she mocked the Conservative MP Philip Davies for trying to get a debate about International Men's Day. He cited men's issues like increasing male suicides, lower life expectancy relative to women, male victims of domestic violence, low educational achievement by working-class white boys and male experience of child custody cases. Phillips openly laughed and pulled faces while Davies spoke, and then stated that: "You’ll have to excuse me for laughing. As the only woman on this committee, it seems like every day to me is International Men’s Day." Davies responded by stating that, "If a male MP had reacted in that way about the need for debate on International Women's Day, there would have been hell to pay. It's entirely possible you'd be removed from Chambers or have the Whip removed. I'm surprised she finds that a laughing matter." Colleagues from both leading parties agreed with Davies, and permission for a debate in Westminster Hall on the matter was eventually granted. She wrote in The Independent: "I commend Philip Davies for changing the thrust of the debate to focus on male suicide – but in and of itself this day serves no useful function".

In January 2016, Phillips said on Question Time that events akin to the mass sexual assaults in Cologne happened every week on Birmingham's Broad Street. She insisted any "patriarchal culture" must be challenged, but the UK should not "rest on its laurels" when two women are murdered every week. In response to criticism she told the Birmingham Mail: "This isn't something that refugees have brought into our country. This is something that's always existed". Journalist Joan Smith criticised these remarks and asked Phillips to admit she was wrong.

Phillips criticised the gender makeup of Labour's Shadow Cabinet reshuffle in January 2016.

In March 2021, following the murder of Sarah Everard, Phillips read out the names of all women killed in the previous year where a man was subsequently convicted. She said "killed women are not vanishingly rare, killed women are common".

Philips' feminist stance has also been accused of excluding trans communities, though this characterization is disputed, and some feminist organisations have raised concerns over her support for the Nordic model for sex work.

Online abuse
Phillips is frequently targeted for abuse by anonymous users on social media. In 2015, she was subjected to rape threats on social media following her objections to International Men's Day. In May 2016, after campaigning against online bullying, Phillips said she received thousands of threatening or demeaning tweets within a 36-hour period, including allusions to rape. After she complained to Twitter and was told the tweets did not break its rules, she accused the company of "colluding" with her abusers.

In response to the murder of Labour MP Jo Cox, in June 2016, Phillips stated that it "makes me want to fight harder". She wrote that they both regularly received online abuse and threats. In August 2016, she told The World at One on Radio 4 that a "panic room" was being installed in her constituency office which now has an alarm system, and that improved locks have been fitted at her home.

In an interview with Stylist, published in October 2019, Phillips said of the hate she had experienced, "Fear and hatred can be the things that drive you. I don't always think of fear as a bad thing, it gives you fight-or-flight".

2015 parliament
Phillips was selected from an all-women shortlist to contest Birmingham Yardley in June 2013, which was then represented by John Hemming of the Liberal Democrats. In the 2015 general election, with an 11.7% swing away from the Liberal Democrats, Phillips was elected as a Member of Parliament (MP), receiving 17,129 votes (41.6%) and achieving a 6,595-vote majority (16.0%) over her closest rival. Her maiden speech concerned homelessness and "improving [Britain]’s response to victims of domestic and sexual violence and abuse in all its forms." In the 2015 Labour leadership election, Phillips nominated Yvette Cooper for Labour leader and Tom Watson for deputy leader.

Phillips was appointed as the Parliamentary Private Secretary (PPS) to Lucy Powell, the Shadow Secretary of State for Education, in September 2015.

In June 2016, she resigned as PPS to Lucy Powell, the Shadow Secretary of State for Education, following the resignation of Powell and other Shadow Cabinet members over the leadership of Corbyn. In July 2016, Phillips threatened to resign from the Labour Party and sit as an independent MP if Corbyn was re-elected as leader of the party, stating she would find it "incredibly difficult" to continue serving under Corbyn's leadership. She supported Owen Smith in the failed attempt to replace Corbyn in the 2016 Labour leadership election.

In September 2016, she was elected chair of the Women's Parliamentary Labour Party (WPLP), defeating her predecessor Dawn Butler, considered a Corbyn ally.

2017 parliament

Phillips criticised the calling of the 2017 snap election. She was reselected as the Labour candidate for Birmingham Yardley, while her predecessor as MP for the seat John Hemming was reselected by the Liberal Democrats, in what was reported as a "grudge match". Phillips subsequently gained 25,398 votes (57.1%), increasing her majority to 16,574 votes (37.2%) over the second-place Conservative candidate, with the Lib Dems finishing in third place. Upon her victory, she continued her criticisms of Hemming.

Following the 2017 snap general election, Phillips said the Women's PLP would co-ordinate to promote policies beneficial to women in the context of a hung parliament.

In July 2017, Phillips called for a review into elections for chairs of House of Commons select committees due to the relatively low number of female candidates.

In March 2018, Phillips again threatened to resign from the Labour Party, this time in response to Labour's handling of sexual harassment allegations against Labour MP Kelvin Hopkins, stating that she would "cut up her membership card" if the alleged victim was questioned by Hopkins as part of the investigation.

In July 2018 it was reported that Phillips served as deputy editor of The House, the in-house Parliamentary magazine published by the Dods Group, which had been purchased by Conservative Party donor and former vice-chairman Michael Ashcroft, earning an annual salary of £8,000 for two hours' work per month.

In March 2019, she said: "I think I'd be a good prime minister" and that "I feel like I can't leave the Labour Party without rolling the dice one more time. I owe it that. But it doesn't own me. It’s nothing more than a logo if it doesn't stand for something that I actually care about – it’s just a f***ing rose."

Phillips also said in March 2019 that she would "leave her son on the steps of Downing Street" after it was announced that her son's school would finish earlier on a Friday due to budget cuts.

In 2019, a controversy emerged as local Muslim parents in Saltley, Birmingham, associated with the Parkfield Community School, objected to lessons on relationships and inclusivity (including but not limited to teaching acceptance of LGBT people), being taught to their primary school children as part of Andrew Moffat's "No Outsiders" programme, on the grounds that LGBT relationships were immoral: one campaigner stated that they saw homosexual relationships as an invalid sexual relationship to have, while others misunderstood the lessons to be teaching children about gay sex. Phillips spoke out publicly against the objecting parents, claiming to feel "bereft about this" and that the material was in her view not "inappropriate." Phillips called for an exclusion zone to prevent protests outside Anderton Park Primary School in Balsall Heath against lessons on inclusivity.

2019 parliament
In October 2019, Phillips said she thought Labour was unlikely to win a majority in a general election. She said if Labour was not elected the biggest party, Corbyn should resign as party leader, whereupon she might stand for the position. In November 2019, it was announced Phillips would stand for the Labour Party in Birmingham Yardley in the 2019 general election. She went on to win the seat once more, with 23,379 votes in her favour (securing a vote share of 54.8%). While the vote share represented a 2.3% decline from 2017, this was relatively small compared to other constituencies: nationwide the Labour Party vote share in 2019 was 7.9% lower than in 2017.

Leadership bid
Following Corbyn's decision to step down as Labour leader after the party's defeat in the 2019 general election, Phillips was suggested as a potential successor. The first poll of Labour members suggested she could secure 12% of first-preference votes in a leadership competition, putting her third behind Sir Keir Starmer (the Shadow Brexit Secretary) and Rebecca Long-Bailey (the Shadow Secretary of State for Business, Energy and Industrial Strategy). 

Phillips announced her bid for the leadership on 3 January 2020 in Grimsby, a seat the Conservative party had gained from Labour in the election. She was the third candidate to announce, following Emily Thornberry and Clive Lewis. Phillips acknowledged her performance in the first candidate hustings was poor, writing "I was awful because I was trying to hit a million different lines and messages in 40 seconds." She dropped out of the leadership election campaign on 21 January, during the second stage of obtaining nominations from trade unions, affiliate bodies and local parties  and subsequently announced her support for Lisa Nandy.

Appointment to the Shadow Frontbench
Phillips was appointed by Keir Starmer to serve as Shadow Minister for Domestic Violence and Safeguarding, a position in the Shadow Home Office, on 9 April 2020. It is the first time she has served on the frontbench.

Parliamentary Standards
In May 2022 Phillips narrowly avoided being referred to the Parliamentary Committee on Standards having been investigated by the Commissioner for Standards for repeatedly failing to register interests within the required timescale. Instead Phillips accepted that she had breached the rules and the matter was resolved through the rectification process.

Personal life
Phillips lives in Moseley and is married to Tom Phillips; the couple have two sons. Phillips employed her husband, previously a lift engineer, as constituency support manager until February 2019.

Former professional footballer Kevin Phillips is her husband's cousin. In 2021, she announced that she had the human papillomavirus in her 20s. During a March 2022 debate on making a pandemic rule allowing at-home abortions permanent, Phillips spoke in favour and stated that she had also received an abortion years earlier.

On 10 December 2021, Phillips presented an episode of the BBC's satirical news quiz Have I Got News for You.

Bibliography

Filmography

References

External links

|-

1981 births
Living people
People from Birmingham, West Midlands
Alumni of the University of Birmingham
Alumni of the University of Leeds
Anti-domestic violence activists
Councillors in Birmingham, West Midlands
English feminists
Female members of the Parliament of the United Kingdom for English constituencies
Labour Party (UK) councillors
Labour Party (UK) MPs for English constituencies
Labour Friends of Israel
People educated at King Edward VI Camp Hill School for Girls
British socialist feminists
UK MPs 2015–2017
UK MPs 2017–2019
UK MPs 2019–present
21st-century British women politicians
Women councillors in England